Fredrik Dversnes (born 20 March 1997) is a Norwegian racing cyclist, who currently rides for UCI ProTeam .

Major results
2019
 8th Gylne Gutuer
2020
 4th Lillehammer GP
 9th Hafjell GP
2021
 1st  Overall International Tour of Rhodes
 1st  Mountains classification, Arctic Race of Norway
2023
 1st  Aggressive rider classification, Tour of Oman

References

External links

1997 births
Living people
Norwegian male cyclists
People from Egersund
Sportspeople from Rogaland